Sleeping Beauty (Italian: La bella addormentata) is a 1942 Italian drama film directed by Luigi Chiarini and starring Luisa Ferida, Amedeo Nazzari and Osvaldo Valenti. The film was screened at the 1942 Venice Film Festival. It is based on a 1919 play by Pier Maria Rosso di San
Secondo. It belongs to the movies of the calligrafismo style.

Cast
 Luisa Ferida as Carmela 
 Amedeo Nazzari as Salvatore detto 'Il Nero della solfara'  
 Osvaldo Valenti as Don Vincenzo Caramandola  
 Teresa Franchini as Zia Agata  
 Pina Piovani as Nunziata  
 Margherita Bossi as Donna Concetta, la barista 
 Giovanni Dolfini as Isidoro 
 Guido Celano as Lo solfataro 
 Angelo Dessy as Un altro solfataro 
 Fiorella Betti as Erminia detta "Pepespezie" 
 Gildo Bocci as Un mercante

References

Bibliography 
 Brunetta, Gian Piero. The History of Italian Cinema: A Guide to Italian Film from Its Origins to the Twenty-first Century.  Princeton University Press, 2009. 
 Moliterno, Gino. The A to Z of Italian Cinema. Scarecrow Press, 2009.

External links 
 

1942 films
Italian drama films
1942 drama films
1940s Italian-language films
Films directed by Luigi Chiarini
Italian films based on plays
Italian black-and-white films
1940s Italian films